Yury Mikhailovich Luzhkov (21 September 1936 – 10 December 2019) was a Russian politician who served as mayor of Moscow from 1992 to 2010. Before the election of Gavriil Popov as the first mayor of Moscow, he also headed the capital in 1990-1991 as chairman of the Mosgorispolkom. He was the vice-chairman and one of the founders of the ruling United Russia party. During Luzhkov's time, Moscow's economy expanded and he presided over large construction projects in the city, including the building of a new financial district. At the same time, he was accused of corruption, bulldozing historic buildings, and poor handling of traffic, as well as the city's smog crisis during the 2010 Russian wildfires. On 28 September 2010, Luzhkov was fired from his post by a decree issued by then-President Dmitry Medvedev.

Early life
Yury Mikhaylovich Luzhkov was born on 21 September 1936 in Moscow. His father, Mikhail Andreyevich Luzhkov, moved to Moscow from a small village in Tver Oblast in the 1930s.

Mayoral career
 

In April 1990, the new chairman of the Moscow City Council, Gavriil Popov, on the recommendation of Boris Yeltsin,  nominated Luzhkov for the post of chairman of the Mosgorispolkom.

Following the August coup Luzhkov was appointed on August 24, 1991, without leaving the post of vice-mayor of Moscow, one of three deputy heads of the Committee on the Operational Management of the Soviet economy, which was created to replace the Cabinet of Ministers, which had supported the coup, and became the last government of the Soviet Union. He was responsible for questions related to the agro-industrial complex, trade, foreign economic relations and the social sphere. 2 months later it became known that Luzhkov left the committee due to employment as vice mayor.

Architecture 
Many old Soviet landmarks, such as Rossiya Hotel or Voentorg, were reconstructed or demolished, as well as several old buildings around the Kadashi Church in the proximity of the Moscow Kremlin. Many neighbourhoods, like Zamoskvorechye, were dramatically changed. Sculptor Zurab Tsereteli enjoyed Luzhkov's personal support in setting many of his works over the city.

In 1999, in order to improve the housing conditions of Moscovites, Yury Luzhkov initiated a major demolition programme to replace Moscow’s old five-story apartment blocks that were unsuitable for renovation because of the outdated technology used during their construction. 1,722 of them were to be razed by 2010. The authorities stipulated that the apartment blocks could only be torn down and replaced after its residents had been moved into new housing.

Registration
Luzhkov's rationale for permanent living place (propiska) registration was that Moscow's city infrastructure could not handle a rapidly growing population. Some of the most blatant limitations were removed by the Supreme Court and the Constitutional Court after a long fight with Luzhkov's lawyers, making the registration process somewhat simpler. In 2003 Privacy International awarded Luzhkov the runner-up position in its Most Egregiously Stupid Award for the propiska rules.

Popularity
In April 2001, 63% of Moscow residents had a good or very good view of Mayor Luzhkov. However, Luzhkov's ratings steadily declined, and according to the latest poll from October 2009, only 36% of Muscovites viewed him positively.

Allegations of corruption
Allegations of wrongdoing by Luzhkov had been made before, but he had been notable for never having lost a libel suit in his career, including against Boris Nemtsov, the newspaper Kommersant, and the New York Times.

Dismissal
Luzhkov was dismissed by President Medvedev on 28 September 2010, after returning from a holiday in Austria, citing "loss of trust", a traditional Russian legal formula for dishonorable dismissal. In recent years, the Kremlin had consistently been replacing old regional heads, elected during Boris Yeltsin's time, with younger candidates. Pundits had been predicting Luzhkov's imminent ousting for years. The September 2010 dismissal followed weeks of speculation regarding Luzhkov's position, caused by his questioning of Medvedev's leadership. Luzhkov had recently criticised Medvedev's decision to halt the construction of a new highway through the Khimki Forest amid protests by environmentalists. Government-controlled television channels had run programs criticizing Luzhkov's handling of the 2010 summer peat fires and accused him and his wife of corruption. Some observers have seen this as being part of a struggle between Medvedev and then-Prime Minister Putin. Luzhkov officially declared that he had left the United Russia party. Luzhkov had sent a letter to the President on 27 September criticizing Medvedev's policy and his administration's actions. According to the President's press-secretary Medvedev read the letter after the decision had been made but it would not have affected that decision in any case.

Post-mayoral activities
In November 2010 Luzhkov gave an interview to the Telegraph newspaper stating that he was sending his daughters to study in London "to protect them from possible persecution". He said that a house had been bought in the West of the city for them. He and his wife intended to visit them regularly.<ref name=Tel1>Former Moscow mayor Yuri Luzhkov: 'I fear for my family'''], Telegraph</ref> Luzhkov also claimed that the Russian authorities were planning to break up his wife's business empire and that the couple would fight the attempt: "We will not give up. My wife will battle for her business and for her honour and self-worth. That is for sure."

On 1 October 2010 Luzhkov was appointed Dean of the Faculty of Management of major cities of the International University in Moscow. The order for appointment was signed by the president of the university, former mayor (and Luzhkov's predecessor as mayor) of Moscow Gavriil Popov.  The faculty of management of large cities was established in 2002 on the initiative of Luzhkov, in the same year Luzhkov became the scientific leader of this faculty and an honorary professor at the university.  On the same day, ex-mayor Luzhkov left his former workplace.

On 21 September 2016, Luzhkov's 80th birthday, Russian President Vladimir Putin signed a decree awarding him the Order of Merit of the Fatherland, 4th degree "for active public work".

In Russia's politics
In 1998, as Boris Yeltsin's political troubles grew partly because of the August economic crisis, Luzhkov formed his own national political faction, Otechestvo (Fatherland), to serve as his base for the upcoming presidential election. Otechestvo had the support of many powerful regional politicians, and it gained further support when it merged with another party, Vsya Rossiya (All Russia) to form Otechestvo-Vsya Rossiya. Many observers of Russian politics believed that Luzhkov and his new ally, former prime minister Yevgeniy Primakov, would be likely to displace both Yeltsin and his inner circle in the parliamentary and presidential elections due to be held in late 1999 and mid-2000, respectively.

However, Luzhkov's fortunes turned when Boris Yeltsin appointed Vladimir Putin as Prime Minister in August 1999. While virtually unknown when first appointed, Putin rapidly gained popular support due to a hard-line law and order image and the backing of powerful state-owned and state-allied media and economic interests. The hard-fought autumn 1999 Duma campaign ended with Otechestvo-Vsya Rossiya only in 3rd place. Compromising, Luzhkov and his party accepted integration with the pro-Putin Unity party into the single United Russia, and supported Putin in the 2000 presidential elections, which he won easily. Though still a co-chairman of United Russia, after this Luzhkov became less active in federal politics.

Criticism
Luzhkov was accused of brutal suppression of opposition protests, and he was widely condemned for leaving Moscow during the smog crisis resulting from the 2010 Russian wildfires. He is also blamed for traffic congestion in the city.

Controversy
In 2002, Luzhkov proposed returning to Lubyanka Square the fifteen-ton iron statue of Felix Dzerzhinsky, founder of the Soviet Cheka. The statue was removed after the failure of the attempted coup against the Soviet government of Mikhail Gorbachev in 1991. Opponents of the proposal collected the signatures of 114,000 Moscow residents against the statue's return.

Stance on Sevastopol
In 1996 Luzhkov, hoping to advance his political stature on a national level, became the main advocate for a claim to the city of Sevastopol in Ukraine. In December, the Russian Federation Council passed a resolution officially claiming the city, affecting negotiations between President Boris Yeltsin and Ukraine's President Leonid Kuchma over possession of the Black Sea Fleet (housed at Sevastopol) and helping spur Ukraine to seek a relationship with NATO.

On 12 May 2008 Luzhkov was banned from entering Ukraine by the Security Service (SBU) after his statement concerning the legal status of Sevastopol:

Destruction of the Rechnik neighbourhood
It was Luzhkov who controversially ordered the destruction of houses built in the Rechnik neighbourhood of Moscow. According to an interview published in the Moskovsky Komsomolets, Luzkhov said that the residents were squatting on land in a "protected environmental zone." Residents claimed that Soviet-era permits to the land, which was set aside as a gardening collective in the 1950s, gave them de facto title over the land the houses were built on and many of these titles were bought or inherited from the original owners; Luzhkov was accused of lobbying the interests of building companies. However, the City Hall claimed that no permissions for private house building on that land were given since the 1950s and that the residents could never claim amnesty because of that. Nevertheless, Luzhkov stated that the city was ready to provide full compensation by offering other land plots in the vicinity of Moscow for veterans of World War II who lived in Rechnik since Soviet times.

Honouring Stalin
In 2010, Luzhkov made public his plans to honour Soviet leader Joseph Stalin with ten posters of him in the city of Moscow, for the first time in around fifty years after Nikita Khrushchev's criticism of Stalin-period policies. The proposal led to controversy in Russia as well as international outcry. Liberal critics expressed concern that Stalin was being rehabilitated as memories of his "reign of terror" faded.

Personal life
Luzhkov married his first wife, Marina Bashilova, in 1958, and had two sons with her, Mikhail and Alexander. Bashilova died from liver cancer in 1989. He met his second wife, businesswoman Yelena Baturina, 27 years his junior, in 1987. They married in 1991 and had two daughters, Elena (born 1992) and Olga (born 1994), and owned a home in the affluent Kensington area of London, purchased in 2013 through an offshore company domiciled in Gibraltar.

Luzhkov frequently appeared in public at different festivals and celebrations, and was an enthusiastic promoter of Moscow. His hobbies included tennis and beekeeping. His support for physical fitness was well known, and a statue of the mayor in tennis garb was created by Zurab Tsereteli.

Personal views
Luzhkov was allegedly a devoted Orthodox Christian believer, often appearing at Christmas and Easter liturgies. A BBC documentary made during the late 1990s questioned this, asserting he was not an Orthodox Christian. When asked why he supported the Church, he replied that he supported its moral teachings. He was friendly with Patriarch Alexy II. In 2005 he was given an award from the International Fund of Unity of Orthodox Christians.

He was critical of homosexuality and issued several bans on the Moscow Pride parade, organised by Nikolai Alekseev. Luzhkov consistently opposed pride parades in the capital. In 2007, he attracted international attention when he said of the 2006 parade: "Last year, Moscow came under unprecedented pressure to sanction the gay parade, which cannot be called anything other than satanic. [... We did not let the parade take place then, and we are not going to allow it in the future." He blamed groups which he accused of receiving grants from the West for spreading what he called "this kind of enlightenment" in Russia. "We think that destructive sects and propaganda of same-sex love are inadmissible," he said of attempts to promote LGBT rights in Russia. Gay activists accused him of homophobia and sent their appeals to the European Court of Human Rights, complaining the breach of Freedom of Assembly, which is granted in the European Convention on Human Rights. On 25 January 2010, he said: "It is high time to crack down on the parade with all the power and justice of the law, instead of talking about human rights. (...) We need a social whip or something like that.''"

Luzhkov was known as an enthusiastic advocate of the Northern river reversal project, which he believed would solve the water problem of Central Asia and earn money for Russia.

Death
Luzkhov died on 10 December 2019 in Munich, Germany at the Klinikum der Universität München where he underwent invasive heart surgery. Luzhkov was administered anesthesia and died from subsequent anaphylactic shock.

Honours and awards
Russia
 Order of Merit for the Fatherland;
1st class (21 September 2006) - for outstanding contribution to strengthening Russian statehood, and socio-economic development of the city
2nd class (14 November 1995) - for services to the state, his great personal contribution to the implementation of reforms aimed at restructuring the city's economy, the success of the reconstruction of the historical city center, the revival of the temples, the construction of the memorial Victory Poklonnaya Hill
3rd class
 Order of Military Merit (1 October 2003) - for his great personal contribution to improving combat readiness and to ensure the defence of the Russian Federation
 Order of Honour (19 August 2000) - for outstanding contribution to the preservation and restoration of cultural and architectural monuments of Moscow
 Medal Defender of a Free Russia (9 November 1993) - for performing his civic duty in defence of democracy and constitutional order on 19–21 August 1991
 State Prize of the Russian Federation
 Medal "In Commemoration of the 850th Anniversary of Moscow"
 Medal "In Commemoration of the 300th Anniversary of Saint Petersburg"
 Honoured Transport Worker of the Russian Federation

Soviet Union
 Order of Lenin
 Order of the Red Banner of Labour
 Medal "For Strengthening Military Cooperation"
 USSR State Prize

Russian regions
 Order of Akhmad Kadyrov (2006, Chechen Republic)
 Medal "For Services to the Chechen Republic" (2005)
 Order of the Republic (2001, Tuva) - for the fruitful cooperation and personal contribution to the socio-economic development of the
 Medal "60 years of education of the Kaliningrad region" (2006)
 Order "For Services to the Kaliningrad region" (Kaliningrad Region, 16 January 2009) - for outstanding services to the Kaliningrad region, related to making a large contribution to its socio-economic development and a significant contribution to protecting the rights of citizens

Foreign
 Order of St. Mashtots (Armenia)
 Order of Friendship of Peoples (Belarus) (16 February 2005) - for his great personal contribution to strengthening economic, scientific, technological and cultural ties between Belarus and the Russian Federation [98]
 Order of Francisc Skorina (Belarus)
 Medal of Francisc Skorina (Belarus, 19 September 1996) - for his significant contribution to strengthening the friendly relations between Belarus and the Russian Federation
 Jubilee Medal "50 Tynga zhyl" ("50 virgin") (Kazakhstan)
 Medal "Astana" (Kazakhstan)
 Order "Danaker" (Kyrgyzstan, 27 February 2006) - for his significant contribution to strengthening friendship and cooperation, developing trade and economic relations between the Kyrgyz Republic and the Russian Federation
 Order of Prince Yaroslav the Wise, 5th class (Ukraine, 23 January 2004) - for personal contribution to the development of cooperation between Ukraine and the Russian Federation
 Order of the Polar Star (Mongolia)
 Chevalier of the National Order of the Cedar (Lebanon)
 Bavarian Order of Merit (Germany)
 State Prize for peace and progress of the First President of the Republic of Kazakhstan (2003)

Religious organizations
 Order of St. Prince Vladimir Equal, 1st class (November 1993) - for participation in the restoration of the Cathedral of Our Lady of Kazan icon in Red Square
 Order of St. Sergius, 1st class (Russian Orthodox Church)
 Order of the Holy Prince Daniel of Moscow, 1st class (Russian Orthodox Church)
 Order of Saint Righteous Grand Duke Dmitry Donskoy, 1st class (Russian Orthodox Church)
 Order of St. Innocent Metropolitan of Moscow and Kolomna, 1st class (Russian Orthodox Church, 2009)
 Order of St. Andrei Rublev, 1st class (Russian Orthodox Church, 2009)
 Order of St. Macarius, Metropolitan of Moscow, 2nd class (Russian Orthodox Church)
 Order of St. Sava, 1st class (Serbian Orthodox Church)
 Order "Al-Fahr" (Medal of Honour) (Council of Muftis of Russia)

Departmental awards
 Medal Anatoly Koni (Ministry of Justice)
 Gold Medal of the Ministry of Agriculture of Russia "for contribution to the development of agro-industrial complex of Russia"
 Medal "Participant humanitarian relief operations" (Russian Emergencies Ministry)
 Golden Olympic Order (IOC, 1998)
 Medal "100 years of trade unions" (FNPR)

Community Awards
 International Leonardo Prize (1996)
 Badge of Honor (Order) "Sports Glory of Russia", 1st class ("Komsomolskaya Pravda" newspaper and the board of the Russian Olympic Committee, November 2002) - for organizing large-scale construction of sports facilities in Moscow

References

External links

 Luzhkov's official site 
 CityMayors feature

1936 births
2019 deaths
Burials at Novodevichy Cemetery
20th-century Russian politicians
21st-century Russian politicians
Grand Crosses of the Order of St. Sava
Knights of the National Order of the Cedar
Mayors of Moscow
Russian political party founders
Recipients of the Olympic Order
Full Cavaliers of the Order "For Merit to the Fatherland"
Recipients of the Order of Francysk Skaryna
Recipients of the Order of Holy Prince Daniel of Moscow
Recipients of the Order of Honour (Russia)
Recipients of the Order of Lenin
Recipients of the Order of Military Merit (Russia)
Recipients of the Order of Prince Yaroslav the Wise, 5th class
Recipients of the Order of Saint Righteous Grand Duke Dmitry Donskoy, 1st class
Recipients of the USSR State Prize
Russian Orthodox Christians from Russia
Soviet politicians
Soviet scientists
State Prize of the Russian Federation laureates
United Russia politicians